Mark Adrian Elgar is an Australian behavioural and evolutionary ecologist, based at the University of Melbourne since 1991. He established his reputation with research on bird foraging strategies and sexual cannibalism in spiders, but now explores a variety of evolutionary questions around sexual selection, social behaviour and chemical communication.

Research career 
In January 1980, Elgar completed his Bachelor of Science with Honours at Griffith University. From 1982-1985, he undertook his PhD research at Cambridge University under Nick Davies, studying the flocking and foraging strategies of house sparrows. According to Elgar, Davies taught him "the value of asking questions that can be resolved by simple experiments, and of treating colleagues respectfully." Elgar was also influenced by evolutionary biologist John Maynard Smith, who attended one of Elgar's seminars at Sussex University and was enthusiastic about his research.

Following the completion of his PhD, Elgar served as a Science and Engineering Research Fellow at University of Oxford (1985-1987). He then returned to Australia, working as a University Research Fellow (1987-1989) and Queen Elizabeth II Research Fellow (1989-1990) at University of New South Wales. He joined the University of Melbourne in 1991, where he became a professor in 2005. There he has served in several roles including  Elected Member, University Council (2004-2007); Associate Dean (Graduate Programs), Faculty of Science (2006-2009); and Domain Leader (Ecology & Evolution), School of BioSciences (2018-2019). From 2013-2016 he was Member, College of Experts, Australian Research Council.

Elgar has served as President of the Australasian Evolution Society and Councillor for the International Society for Behavioral Ecology. He was editor-in-chief of the journal Behavioral Ecology (2006-2011), and has also been editor-of-chief for the Australian Journal of Zoology. As of 2016, he is Field Chief Editor for Frontiers in Ecology and Evolution.

In 2021 Elgar opined that an increase in wasp numbers in residential areas may be due to bushfires destroying their nests in natural environments.

References 

Living people
Australian biologists
Australian zoologists
Evolutionary biologists
Academic staff of the University of Melbourne
Alumni of the University of Cambridge
Griffith University alumni
Year of birth missing (living people)
20th-century Australian people
21st-century Australian people